This is a list of South American cichlid species that are commonly kept by aquarists.

References 

 List